The 1948 Cincinnati Reds season was a season in American baseball. The team finished seventh in the National League with a record of 64–89, 27 games behind the Boston Braves. This season was the first wherein the Reds were broadcast on television all over Cincinnati via WLWT, with a television simulcast of the radio commentary from WCPO with Waite Hoyt in the booth.

Offseason 
 Prior to 1948 season (exact date unknown)
Hobie Landrith was signed as an amateur free agent by the Reds.
Bob Nieman was signed as an amateur free agent by the Reds.

Regular season

Season standings

Record vs. opponents

Notable transactions 
 September 29, 1948: The Reds traded a player to be named later and cash to the Brooklyn Dodgers for Jimmy Bloodworth. The Reds completed the deal by sending Kermit Wahl to the Dodgers before the 1949 season.

Roster

Player stats

Batting

Starters by position 
Note: Pos = Position; G = Games played; AB = At bats; H = Hits; Avg. = Batting average; HR = Home runs; RBI = Runs batted in

Other batters 
Note: G = Games played; AB = At bats; H = Hits; Avg. = Batting average; HR = Home runs; RBI = Runs batted in

Pitching

Starting pitchers 
Note: G = Games pitched; IP = Innings pitched; W = Wins; L = Losses; ERA = Earned run average; SO = Strikeouts

Other pitchers 
Note: G = Games pitched; IP = Innings pitched; W = Wins; L = Losses; ERA = Earned run average; SO = Strikeouts

Relief pitchers 
Note: G = Games pitched; W = Wins; L = Losses; SV = Saves; ERA = Earned run average; SO = Strikeouts

Farm system 

LEAGUE CHAMPIONS: Lockport

Notes

References 
1948 Cincinnati Reds season at Baseball Reference

Cincinnati Reds seasons
Cincinnati Reds season
Cincinnati Reds